Ernest G. Bormann (July 28, 1925 – December 27, 2008) was Professor Emeritus in the Department of Speech-Communication at the University of Minnesota. He received his B.A. from the University of South Dakota in 1949 and earned his M.A. and Ph.D. from the University of Iowa in 1953. He originated the Symbolic Convergence Theory of human communication, which emphasizes the sharing of group "fantasies" (creative interpretations) as a method of developing shared meaning. Furthermore, he is the author of numerous books and articles.

Publications

 Bormann, E. G. (1972). Fantasy and rhetorical vision: The rhetorical criticism of social reality. Quarterly Journal of Speech, 58(4), 396–407.
 Bormann, E. G. (1980). Communication theory. New York: Holt, Rinehart & Winston.
 Bormann, E. G. (1980). The paradox and promise of small group communication revisited. Central States Speech Journal, 31(3), 214–220.
 Bormann, E. G. (1982). Fantasy and rhetorical vision: Ten years later. Quarterly Journal of Speech, 68(3), 288–305.
 Bormann, E. G. (1985). The source of fantasy: Restoring the American dream. Carbondale, IL: Southern Illinois University Press.
 Bormann, E. G. (1985). Symbolic convergence theory: A communication formulation. Journal of Communication, 35(4), 128–138.
 Bormann, E. G. (1990). Small group communication: Theory and practice (3rd ed.). New York: Harper & Row.

External links
 In Memoriam Ernest G. Bormann, 1925-2008: http://comm.umn.edu/bormann.html
 Official Homepage: http://www.vayne.com/bormann.us

References

Communication theorists
1925 births
2008 deaths